Tinhosa Pequena is an uninhabited islet in São Tomé and Príncipe, located  southwest of the island of Príncipe and  northeast of the island of São Tomé. Together with the larger islet Tinhosa Grande, 4 kilometers to its south, it forms the Pedras Tinhosas group.

Since 2012, it forms a part of the UNESCO's Island of Príncipe Biosphere Reserve (also known as Príncipe Biosphere Reserve as it encompass its surrounding islands).

References

Uninhabited islands of São Tomé and Príncipe
Príncipe